The Vietnam national under-20 futsal team is a representative of Vietnam in futsal tournaments that pertain to under-20 age level.

Competition records

AFC U-20 Futsal Championship 

*Denotes draws include knockout matches decided on penalty kicks.
**Round = Group stage or Round of 16 or Quarter-finals or Semi-finals or Final.

Coaching staff

Players

Current squad 
The following players had been called up for the 2019 AFC U-20 Futsal Championship qualifier.
Caps and goals as of 09 December 2018 after the match against Malaysia.

Recent call-ups 
The following players have been called up for the 2017 AFC U-20 Futsal Championship
Caps and goals as of May 2017 after the match against Japan.

Matches 
2017

2018

2019

References

External links

Vietnam national teams on vff website

Asian national futsal teams
Youth sport in Vietnam
Futsal in Vietnam
F